The 2016 Libertarian National Convention was the gathering at which delegates of the Libertarian Party chose the party's nominees for president and vice president in the 2016 national election. The party selected Gary Johnson, a former Governor of New Mexico, as its presidential candidate, with Bill Weld, a former Governor of Massachusetts as his running mate. The convention was held from May 26–30, 2016, in Orlando, Florida.

Theme

The theme of the 2016 convention was #LegalizeFreedom.

Events

 May 26 – The presidential candidates Marc Allan Feldman, Gary Johnson, John McAfee, Darryl W. Perry, and Austin Petersen participated in a political debate at the convention.
 May 27 – A debate between the Libertarian candidates seeking the vice presidential nomination was held. On the same day, the candidates for chairperson of the LNC debated.
 May 28 –  A debate between the Libertarian presidential candidates was held. The debate was televised live by C-SPAN. It was moderated by Larry Elder.
 May 29 – The vote and nomination of the Libertarian presidential and vice-presidential candidates was held and televised by C-SPAN.  Multiple ballots extended this.
 In addition to the announcement of the Party's presidential ticket, a chairperson for the LNC was elected at the convention. Incumbent chairman of the Libertarian National Committee, Nicholas Sarwark was re-elected to the position.

Presidential delegate count

No candidate achieved the majority on the first ballot, so there was a second ballot vote.  Due to finishing last of the six nominated candidates, McCormick was excluded from the second ballot.

State by state delegate count

No candidate achieved the majority on the first ballot, so there was a second ballot vote.  Due to receiving less than 5% of the votes, McCormick was excluded from the second ballot.

Vice-presidential delegate count
Prior to vice presidential balloting, Marc Allan Feldman endorsed Gary Johnson's running mate Bill Weld, and Austin Petersen endorsed Alicia Dearn. Judd Weiss, whom John McAfee had selected as his running mate, withdrew his name from consideration and endorsed William Coley, who had been Darryl Perry's running mate. Consequently, McAfee endorsed Derrick Grayson, who received a write-in vote in each round of the presidential contest but had not campaigned for either the presidency or vice presidency prior to the convention.

No candidate achieved the majority on the first ballot, so there was a second ballot vote. Due to finishing last of the five nominated candidates, Dearn was excluded from the second ballot. Dearn then endorsed Weld. Additionally, both Coley and Grayson withdrew their names and endorsed Sharpe.  However, Grayson withdrew his candidacy after the second ballots had been handed out, and therefore his name remained on the ballot as a valid candidate.

Speakers
Notable speakers included:
 Craig Bowden, 2016 candidate for the U.S. House of Representatives from Utah's 1st congressional district
 William Coley, 2016 Libertarian vice presidential candidate
 Judge Jim Gray, 2012 Libertarian Vice Presidential nominee
 Larry Elder, lawyer, writer and radio and television personality who calls himself the "Sage of South Central," a district of Los Angeles, California
 Bruce Fein, lawyer specializing in constitutional and international law
 Sharon Harris, libertarian political activist and president of the Advocates for Self-Government, author
 Carla Howell, political activist and small government advocate
 Adam Kokesh, Iraq War veteran, anti-war and libertarian activist, and author
 Tim Moen, Leader of the Libertarian Party of Canada since May 2014, firefighter, paramedic, business owner, filmmaker, and volunteer
 John Moore, former member of the Nevada Assembly representing District 8, realtor
 Jordan Page, singer-songwriter and musician
 Jim Rogers, Chairman of Rogers Holdings and Beeland Interests, Inc., Co-founder of the Quantum Fund, businessman, investor and author
 Jeffrey Tucker, economics writer of the Austrian School, advocate of anarcho-capitalism and Bitcoin, publisher of libertarian books, conference speaker, and internet entrepreneur
 Dr. Thomas Woods, historian, author, and senior fellow of the Mises Institute

Incidents
 On May 29, candidate for chairman of the LNC James Weeks took stage and stripped down to a thong, saying "I thought we could use a little bit of fun." He danced on the stage before announcing the suspension of his bid for chairperson. He was booed loudly by the delegates and removed from the convention. The incident was streamed live on C-SPAN. This took place during the tabulation of votes on the second ballot for vice president, and many delegates attempted to make a motion to expel Weeks from the party. This was cut short when chairman Nicholas Sarwark moved to set the matter aside and announce the results of the vice presidential nomination. Weeks was later expelled from the Libertarian Party of Michigan, which disavowed all support for his candidacy for county Sheriff.
 After losing the nomination to Gary Johnson, Austin Petersen endorsed the nominee and gave him a plastic replica of a type of pistol owned by George Washington. Several delegates attending the convention later reported seeing Gary Johnson, the party's nominee, tossing the gift in the garbage. It was returned to Petersen by a family that attended the convention. A spokesman for the campaign apologized on behalf of Gov. Johnson, and explained the frustration arose from Petersen handing Johnson the replica before immediately launching into an attack on Johnson's endorsement of Weld for vice president. Petersen expressed a desire to move past the incident, encouraged his supporters to do the same, and confirmed that his endorsement of Johnson for the general election remained unchanged.

See also
 Libertarian National Convention
 Libertarian Party presidential debates and forums, 2016
 Libertarian Party presidential primaries, 2016
 United States Libertarian Party
 Other U.S. political parties' presidential nominating conventions of 2016:
 Constitution Party National Convention
 Democratic National Convention
 Green National Convention
 Republican National Convention
 2016 United States presidential election

References

External links
 Official 2016 Convention web site
 Official party web site

2010s in Orlando, Florida
Libertarian National Convention
Libertarian National Convention
Gary Johnson
John McAfee
Libertarian Party (United States) National Conventions
Libertarian National Convention
Political conventions in Florida
Libertarian National Convention